Albert Victor Walsh (31 January 1877 – 21 June 1956) was an Australian rules footballer who played for the Collingwood Football Club in the Victorian Football League (VFL).

Notes

External links 

Albert Walsh's profile at Collingwood Forever

1877 births
1956 deaths
Australian rules footballers from Victoria (Australia)
Collingwood Football Club players